Naukar is a 1943 Indian Bollywood film directed by Shaukat Hussain Rizvi and starring Chandra Mohan, Noor Jehan and Shobhna Samarth. It was the fifth-highest-grossing Indian film of 1943.

Cast
This is the list of actors and actresses in this film.
 Chandra Mohan as  Fazlu
 Noor Jehan
 Mirza Musharraf 
 Shobhna Samarth as Nargis
 Balwant Singh as Salim, son of Fazlu
 Yakub as Sadiq

Film crew
Film musical score was by Rafiq Ghaznavi and Shanti Kumar. Film song lyrics were by Akhtar Sheerani, Munshi Shams and Nazim Panipati.

References

External links
 

1943 films
1940s Hindi-language films
Indian drama films
Indian black-and-white films
1943 drama films
Hindi-language drama films
Saadat Hasan Manto